Note — many sporting events did not take place because of World War I

1917 in sports describes the year's events in world sport.

American football
College championship
 College football national championship – Georgia Tech Yellow Jackets (coached by John Heisman)
Camp Randall Stadium, home of the Wisconsin Badgers, opens

Association football
Europe
 There is no major football in Europe due to World War I
Norway
 Foundation of Rosenborg BK at Trondheim

Athletics
Men's 1500 metres
 John Zander (Sweden) breaks the world record by running a time of 2:19.1

Australian rules football
VFL Premiership:
 Collingwood wins the 21st VFL Premiership: Collingwood 9.20 (74) d Fitzroy 5.9 (39) at Melbourne Cricket Ground (MCG)
South Australian Football League:
 not contested due to World War I
West Australian Football League:
 15 September: South Fremantle 6.5 (41) defeats East Fremantle 3.8 (26) for their second consecutive WAFL premiership.

Bandy
Sweden
 Championship final – IFK Uppsala 11–2 AIK

Baseball
World Series
 6–15 October — Chicago White Sox (AL) defeats New York Giants (NL) to win the 1917 World Series by 4 games to 2.

Boxing
Events
 Ted "Kid" Lewis regains the World Welterweight Championship and holds it until 1919.
 Al McCoy loses the World Middleweight Championship title to Mike O'Dowd, who knocks him out in the 6th round at Brooklyn
 Benny Leonard, widely regarded as the greatest-ever lightweight, defeats Freddie Welsh at New York to win the World Lightweight Championship, which he holds until he retires in 1925
 Another great champion, Pete Herman defeats Kid Williams over 20 rounds at New Orleans to take the World Bantamweight Championship, which he holds until 1920
Lineal world champions
 World Heavyweight Championship – Jess Willard
 World Light Heavyweight Championship – Battling Levinsky
 World Middleweight Championship – Al McCoy → Mike O'Dowd
 World Welterweight Championship – Jack Britton → Ted "Kid" Lewis
 World Lightweight Championship – Freddie Welsh → Benny Leonard
 World Featherweight Championship – Johnny Kilbane
 World Bantamweight Championship – Kid Williams → Pete Herman
 World Flyweight Championship – Jimmy Wilde

Canadian football
Grey Cup
 not contested due to World War I

Cricket
Events
 There is no first-class cricket in England, Australia, New Zealand, South Africa or the West Indies due to World War I
India
 Bombay Quadrangular – Europeans shared with Parsees

Cycling
Tour de France
 not contested due to World War I
Giro d'Italia
 not contested due to World War I

Figure skating
World Figure Skating Championships
 not contested due to World War I

Golf
Events
 All major championships are cancelled due to World War I

Handball
 The first official handball match was played on December 2 in Berlin, Germany.

Horse racing
England
 Grand National – not held due to World War I
 1,000 Guineas Stakes – Diadem
 2,000 Guineas Stakes – Gay Crusader
 The Derby – Gay Crusader
 The Oaks – Sunny Jane
 St. Leger Stakes – Gay Crusader
Australia
 Melbourne Cup – Westcourt
Canada
 King's Plate – Belle Mahone
Ireland
 Irish Grand National – Pay Only
 Irish Derby Stakes – First Flier 
USA
 Kentucky Derby – Omar Khayyam
 Preakness Stakes – Kalitan
 Belmont Stakes – Hourless

Ice hockey
Stanley Cup
 17–26 March — Seattle Metropolitans (PCHA) defeats Montreal Canadiens (NHA) in the 1917 Stanley Cup Finals by 3 games to 1
Events
 Allan Cup – Toronto Dentals 
 10 November — after Eddie Livingstone, owner of the Toronto NHA team, refuses to sell, the NHA votes to suspend operations 
 26 November — in a secret meeting, several owners of the NHA form the National Hockey League (NHL) to force out the owner of the Toronto Blueshirts NHA team. Toronto's Arena Gardens will operate a temporary franchise in Toronto while Quebec Bulldogs becomes a NHL member but is suspended for the inaugural season.
 19 December — the opening NHL games are played to begin the new league's inaugural season

Motor racing
Events
 No major races are held anywhere worldwide due to World War I

Multi-sport events
Far Eastern Championship Games
 Third Far Eastern Championship Games held in Tokyo, Empire of Japan

Rowing
The Boat Race
 Oxford and Cambridge Boat Race – not contested due to World War I
 International Eight Boat Race - England v Australia. Rowed Putney To Hammersmith, London, 20th Oct. 1917. Won By Australia by 3/4 length.

Rugby league
England
 All first-class competitions are cancelled due to World War I
Australia
 NSW Premiership – Balmain (outright winner)
New Zealand
1917 New Zealand rugby league season

Rugby union
Five Nations Championship
 Five Nations Championship series is not contested due to World War I

Speed skating
Speed Skating World Championships
 not contested due to World War I

Tennis
Australia
 Australian Men's Singles Championship – not contested due to World War I
England
 Wimbledon Men's Singles Championship – not contested due to World War I
 Wimbledon Women's Singles Championship – not contested due to World War I
France
 French Men's Singles Championship – not contested due to World War I
 French Women's Singles Championship – not contested due to World War I
USA
 American Men's Singles Championship – Lindley Murray (USA) defeats Nathaniel Niles (USA) 5–7 8–6 6–3 6–3
 American Women's Singles Championship – Molla Bjurstedt Mallory (Norway) defeats Marion Vanderhoef Morse (USA) 4–6 6–0 6–2
Davis Cup
 1917 International Lawn Tennis Challenge – not contested

References

 
Sports by year